Wien Oberdöbling is a railway station serving Döbling, the nineteenth district of Vienna.

References 

Oberdöbling

Buildings and structures in Döbling